Maurice English (October 21, 1909 – November 18, 1983) was a poet, journalist, and author who is noted for having headed the presses of the University of Chicago, Temple University, and the University of Pennsylvania.

Following his death, English’s family established the Maurice English Poetry Award, which honors an author in his or her sixth decade of life (fifty or beyond) for a distinguished book of poems published during the preceding calendar year. The award acknowledges that English's first volume of poetry, Midnight in the Century, was published in his 55th year. It carries an honorarium of $3,000 and a request for a public reading in Philadelphia. The MEPAward was first given in 1985 to Jane Cooper for Scaffolding: New and Selected Poems (1985).

Selected publications

Recipients of the Maurice English Poetry Award
1985: Jane Cooper, Scaffolding: New and Selected Poems
1986: Linda Pastan, A Fraction of Darkness
1987: Philip Booth, Relations
1988: David Ray, Sam's Book.
1989: Jean Valentine, Home Deep Blue: New and selected poems.
1990: W. S. Merwin, Selected Poems
1991: Richard Fein, Kafka's Ear
2001: Kay Ryan, Say Uncle
2002: Robert Bly, The Night Abraham Called to the Stars
2003: Samuel Hazo, Just Once: New and Selected Poems
2004: R. T. Smith, The Hollow Log Lounge
2005: Caroline Knox, He Paves the Road with Iron Bars

References

1909 births
1983 deaths
20th-century American poets